The Princess and the Pea is a 2002 animated musical fantasy film adaptation of the popular 1835 fairy tale "The Princess and the Pea" by Hans Christian Andersen. The film was directed by Mark Swan. It was released August 16, 2002 as an American-Hungarian production of Feature Films for Families & Swan Productions. The script writers were Forrest S. Baker and Ken Cromar.

The film won two Accolade Competition Awards of Excellence In 2003 and 2004, both for the musical score by composer Alan Williams. The film was also nominated for a Young Artist Award in 2003, in the category of "Best Family Feature Film - Animation".

Plot

War and famine have destroyed the glory of an old kingdom. The story of how a princess was discovered by a pea became lost in the process. Sebastian the royal raven tries to restore the story using an old tapestry found by a young Prince Rollo of the far away kingdom, but it is partially torn. It is written that if the Legend of the Pea is lost, the Kingdom will fall at the reign of the 18th king, who unfortunately happens to be Prince Laird, the primary candidate for the throne, selfish and greedy eldest son of the old King Windham, who believes that riches and fashions is what it takes to rule. With the help of Sebastian & Rollo, Laird’s noble and kind younger brother Prince Heath is crowned King in accordance to the law of being the “first” son to enter the throne room during the ceremony, much to the chagrin of Laird. Heath proves to be a far fairer ruler by sentencing Laird to become Ruler of the Pig Kingdom, where the older brother vows revenge. Nine months later, Heath's wife Mariana delivers a daughter, but dies during childbirth. Laird's greedy and gluttonous wife Helsa also gives birth to a daughter simultaneously. Laird conceives an evil plan to regain the crown. He sends Helsa to take care of Heath's daughter, making King believe that Helsa lost her baby. During the night, Laird swaps his and Helsa’s daughter with Heath’s, intending to give her away, so his child can rule. Helsa, who feels sympathetic towards her niece as she too lost her mother at a young age, remorsefully begs Laird to give the baby to a loving family.

Years later, Heath's daughter, named Daria, has grown into a beautiful, kind and gentle young woman. Laird is revealed to have broken his promise to Helsa, for he has instead placed Daria in the care of lazy pig herders who are hired to watch after her. Daria is forced to work for her lazy stepfamily, who treat her cruelly and lie around all day while she does all the chores. In the meantime, her cousin Hildegard has matured to be wicked and vain, as intended by Laird and Helsa. She fills in Daria’s place as the princess, although she treats everyone around her with cruelty, which does not help the Kingdom nor Heath, who (believing her to be his daughter) struggles to raise her properly. She also has no idea that her real father is Laird, and therefore she's not the rightful heiress to the throne. Prince Rollo, now a young man, returns to Heath's castle, dreaming of romance and happiness. However, he misinterprets the concept, as he believes that the perfect woman for him must be kind and gentle, but, most importantly, must also be born into nobility. Hildegard, upon seeing him and hearing about his wealth, decides to marry the prince. Rollo, repulsed by her greediness and selfish behavior, refuses and flees. Hildegard sets foot to pursue him, but loses the trail. During her pursuit, Helsa encounters Laird. He — impressed with how his daughter turned out to be & her immediate claim for Rollo — informs Helsa that the time has come to tell Hildegard of her true lineage (although, the princess responds to this with anger and disgust).

Meanwhile Rollo, on his quest to find a bride, meets Daria and her trusted pig companions; Princess, Hungry, and Fearless. She brings him to her “secret place”, where Rollo is charmed by her beauty and kindness. The two fall in love, but are forced to separate. Despite having feelings for Daria, Rollo rejects the idea of marrying her since she isn't a princess. Rollo continues in his search for a real princess to marry, desiring a woman of proper lineage, beauty, grace, and class. Unfortunately, while he does encounter beautiful princesses, they all sadly disappoint him due to their spoiled personalities and pampered lifestyles. Rollo realizes he shouldn't love someone because of their titles, but because of who they are. Upon this realization, he realizes that Daria is the right person for him and rushes to confess his rekindled feelings for her.

Meanwhile, Sebastian has been searching for a lost prophecy that dictates: “to discover true nobility, one must place a pea beneath twenty mattresses...”. Unfortunately, his search to discover the mystery of peas always ends in vain. Meanwhile, King Heath admits that he is greatly disappointed with Hildegard’s upbringing. Nonetheless, he finds solace in knowing that Rollo has found the girl of his dreams, as her personality bears a striking resemblance to his late wife. Heath then decides to disinherit Hildegard and leaves his kingdom to Rollo and his chosen bride-to-be. He asks Sebastian to deliver the important message to Rollo. Learning about Heath's plan, Helsa has her and Laird’s pet falcon, Plague, intercept the message and bring it to Laird's attention. Laird turns the entire Pig Kingdom against Daria, claiming her to be a witch who can talk to animals. A mob pursues her through the forest and burn down her hiding place, where she and Rollo first met.

Rollo returns to the kingdom in an attempt to save Daria, not knowing she had already escaped with the help of her animal companions. Sebastian finally discovers the full prophecy in the ballroom of Daria's hiding place, which turns out to be the original palace from where the prophecy originated from. Above the prophecy is a stained-glass window that bears the image of an unnamed queen, Daria's ancestor, who brought about the Golden Age of the Kingdom before it was overtaken by its Dark Age.

The prophecy reads:

“To Reveal the Heart of True Nobility

Place the Pea Twenty Mattresses Deep

The Princess True is Love and Sensitivity

Upon Such, She Can Never Sleep”

Delighted at solving the obstinate mystery, Sebastian celebrates, not aware that the building has caught on fire. Rollo rescues him and the pair exit the smoldering structure. Weak from smoke inhalation, he cries out for Daria before passing out in front of the mob. Laird lies to the crowd, telling them that he called for Hildegard and wants to marry her. Rollo is taken to the castle and treated for his injuries. Upon hearing the speculation of his wish to marry Hildegard, Heath plans the wedding. Hildegard's orders dictate that the wedding is to take place the moment Rollo heals. While mourning Daria, whom he believes to be dead, he decides to go through with the wedding, disheartened and believing that he has nothing left to lose.

Daria, determined to find Rollo and fed up with the abuse she was put through, finally leaves her stepfamily. She tries to find Rollo in the neighboring kingdom and is rudely pushed aside by its people. She helps Sasha, a servant who fell and hurt herself, to walk to the castle. Sebastian appears after awakening from a head injury and is informed of the impending wedding. Seeing Sebastian's twenty feather beds, Daria decides to lie down for a moment. Desperate for a solution to their predicament, Sebastian decides to test the pea within the mattresses on the girl. It seems all hope is lost when she appears to be able to sleep peacefully, but soon Daria finds that she is unable to sleep, as there is something hard underneath. Seeing this, Sebastian deduces that Daria is the true Princess, for she felt the pea through twenty mattresses. He then sees Daria's birthmark, a heart on her foot, which he remembers the Princess having when he saw her many years ago as a baby, finally realizing that Daria is Heath’s real daughter and the true heiress to the throne.

The raven plans to tell everyone of the birthmark, but is intercepted when Laird and Helsa capture and imprison him. He escapes with the help of Fearless and interrupts the wedding, revealing the truth. Hildegard is forced to show her foot at the behest of everyone as evidence, which shows a birthmark similar to Daria’s, but before the wedding can continue, Rollo's dog, Winthrop, licks her foot, revealing the birthmark to be paint. Before telling everyone of the real claimant to the title, Laird shows up, holding Daria hostage. He tries to eliminate Rollo by throwing a chandelier on top of him, but he is rescued by Heath, who was seemingly killed. Miraculously, he regains consciousness and demands the release of his daughter, angering his brother.

Laird, along with Helsa and Hildegard, flee with Daria accompanying them. He sets up a trap to get rid of Rollo, whom he knows to be following him. Thanks to Fearless setting off traps, Rollo confronts Laird and survives another assassination attempt. Atop the castle’s tower, Rollo finds Hildegard holding Daria hostage, threatening to toss her over the fence. Laird knocks Rollo off the edge, causing him to dangle for dear life, and orders Plague to end him. Thankfully, Rollo is saved by Sebastian and Daria. Together, they defeat Laird by throwing him into the moat below, just before he is about to attack Rollo yet again. When Hildegard attempts to kill Daria, and she nearly falls to her demise, Rollo saves Daria. Fearless scares Hildegard, who also falls in the moat. Laird, Helsa, and Hildegard are then arrested for their transgressions. Fearless (who was initially cowardly in the beginning of the film) finally lives up to his name by helping the crew defeat Hildegard.

Rollo and Daria are reunited. The prince introduces her to Heath, who have not seen her since her infancy. Heath is delighted to see that Daria grew up to be just like Mariana, and celebrates his reunion with his real daughter at last. The couple marry in the ancient kingdom and live happily ever after.

Voice cast
 Amanda Waving as Princess Daria
 Jonathan Firth as Prince Rollo
 Dan Finnerty as Prince Rollo's singing voice
 Steven Webb as young Prince Rollo
 Nigel Lambert as Sebastian the Raven
 Lincoln Hoppe as King Heath of the Corazion Kingdom
 Ronan Vibert as King Laird of the Pig Kingdom
 Eve Karpf as Queen Helsa
 Liz May Brice as Princess Hildegard
 Richard Ridings as King Windham, Button
 Patsy Rowlands as Sasha the Maid

References

External links 
 
 Film details
 

2002 films
2002 animated films
Films based on fairy tales
Films based on works by Hans Christian Andersen
American children's animated adventure films
American children's animated fantasy films
American children's animated musical films
American fantasy adventure films
Hungarian animated films
Fictional princesses
Films about royalty
Films set in the Middle Ages
2000s American animated films
2000s musical films
2000s fantasy adventure films
Works based on The Princess and the Pea
IMAX films
2000s English-language films